LDV may refer to:

LDV Group, formerly Leyland DAF Vans, UK
 The Football League Trophy was called LDV Vans Trophy 2000-2007
LDV USA Manufacturer of the iconic Snap-on vans & Custom Specialty Vehicles in USA
Local Defence Volunteers, renamed Home Guard (United Kingdom)
Lansing Derby Vixens, a roller derby league, Michigan, US
Laser Doppler vibrometer, for measuring vibration
Lactate dehydrogenase elevating virus
Lisa De Vanna, an Australian soccer player
Leonardo da Vinci

In transport:
 Light Duty Vehicle, a light commercial vehicle
 “Light delivery vehicle” in South Africa: motor vehicle designed or adapted for the conveyance of persons and freight with no heavy axle.